The 1972 Louisiana gubernatorial election was held on February 1, 1972. Edwin Edwards defeated Republican candidate David Treen to become Governor of Louisiana. 

Party primaries were held on November 6, 1971, and a run-off was held for the Democratic nomination on December 18, 1971. These were the last closed primaries for Governor of Louisiana before the state adopted its current primary election system.

Democratic primary

Candidates 
 Taddy Aycock, Lieutenant Governor
 Samuel Bell Sr.
 Harold Lee Bethune II
 David L. Chandler
 Huey P. Coleman
 Jimmie Davis, former Governor from 1944 to 1948 and 1960 to 1964
 Edwin Edwards, U.S. Representative from Crowley
 J. Bennett Johnston, State Senator from Shreveport
 Gillis Long, former U.S. Representative from Alexandria
 Speedy Long, U.S. Representative from LaSalle Parish
 Warren J. "Puggy" Moity
 James Moore
 Frank T. Salter Jr.
 John G. Schwegman, grocery store magnate and State Senator from Metairie
 Jimmy Strain, pediatrician and State Representative from Shreveport
 Addison Roswell Thompson, perennial candidate and white supremacist

Campaign 
Early in the campaign, conventional wisdom of many political analysts predicted that the race's top candidates would be Gillis Long, Jimmie Davis, and C.C. "Taddy" Aycock.  However, the two candidates to make the runoff, Edwin Edwards and J. Bennett Johnston, were relative newcomers to the Louisiana political scene, despite Edwards' Congressional tenure.

Cousins Gillis and Speedy Long both ran in a rematch of their 1964 primary race for Congress when Speedy unseated Gillis. Ironically, Gillis reclaimed that House seat the next year when Speedy retired after Edwards and the Louisiana Legislature redistricted him into the same district as longtime incumbent Otto Passman.

Results

Run-off

Republican primary

Candidates
Robert Max Ross
Dave Treen, perennial candidate for U.S. Representative from Metairie

Results

General election

Results

Sources 

Louisiana Secretary of State.   Primary Election Returns, 1971

References 

1971
Louisiana
Louisiana
Gubernatorial
Gubernatorial
February 1972 events in the United States